Uwem Akpan  is a Nigerian writer. He is the author of Say You're One of Them (2008), a collection of five stories (each set in a different African country) published by Little, Brown & Company.  The book inspired Angelique Kidjo to write the song "Agbalagba". It made the Best of the Year list at People magazine, The Wall Street Journal, and other places.  The New York Times made it the Editor's Choice, and Entertainment Weekly listed it at #27 in their Best of the Decade.  Say You're One of Them won the Commonwealth Writers Prize (Africa Region), the Open Book Prize, and the Hurston/Wright Legacy Award. A New York Times and Wall Street Journal #1 bestseller, it has been translated into 12 languages. It won the Commonwealth Writers' Prize, the PEN Open Book Award, and was picked by the Oprah Winfrey Book Club September 17, 2009, in Central Park. Two months later, Oprah interviewed Uwem in Chicago as part of her bookclub event with Anderson Cooper giving short commentaries on some of the African countries in Uwem's book. The interview was streamed live simultaneously from Oprah.com, Facebook and CNN.

Uwem's second book, New York, My Village, was published on Nov 2, 2021 by W. W. Norton. The book was picked by Strand Bookstore as their Pick of the Month for November 2021.

Life
He attended Saint Paul's Primary School, Ekparakwa; Methodist Primary School, Usung Ibong; and Saint Anne's Primary School, Ifuho; and his secondary education was at Queen of Apostles, Afaha Obong, all in Akwa Ibom State in Nigeria. Uwem grew up listening to Annang folktales from his mom and grandparents and aunties and uncles. The Bible and the horrific experience of the Biafran War provided other avenues for stories. When he learned to read in primary school, he transferred this love for stories to books.  When teachers went on strike while he was in Primary Five in the early 80s, it made no difference to him. He even grumbled when the term resumed! After studying humanities and philosophy at Creighton University and Gonzaga University, he received a theology degree from the Catholic University of East Africa in Kenya. In 2003, Akpan was ordained a Jesuit priest. Uwem is also a graduate of the University of Michigan's MFA program.

In 2009, Oprah Winfrey recommended Uwem Akpan's Say You're One of Them as her 63rd book club selection. Uwem said he was humbled to learn his debut collection of short stories had caught Winfrey's eye. Oprah said that Say You're One of Them "left [her] stunned and profoundly moved." The five short stories and novellas give voice to African children growing up in the face of incredible adversity.

Between 2010 and 2017, Uwem was a Fellow at the Black Mountain Institute (University of Nevada, Las Vegas), Institute for the Humanities (University of Michigan, Ann Arbor), Yaddo (Saratoga Springs, New York), the Cullman Center of the New York Public Library (NYC, New York) and the Hank Center for Catholic Heritage (Loyola University Chicago, 2017). In 2015, Akpan left the Catholic priesthood to focus more time on his writing.

Uwem lives in Gainesville, Florida, and teaches in the University of Florida's writing program.

Works

New York, My Village. W. W. Norton, Nov 2021.

Awards 

 Winner of the Commonwealth Writers' Prize
 Winner of the PEN Open Book Award
Winner of the Hurston/Wright Legacy Award
Finalist for the Dayton Literary Peace Prize in the Fiction Category
Finalist for the Los Angeles Times Seidenbaum Award for First Fiction
Nominated for the Guardian First Book Award
Nominated for the Caine Prize for African Writing
Longlisted for the Story Prize

References

External links 

Official website
Say You're One of Them, official website (includes excerpt, author bio, etc.).
"As Africa's Horrors Rage, Suffer the Little Children", New York Times, review by Janet Maslin, June 27, 2008.
"Unflinching Evil in 'Say You're One of Them'", NPR review by Maureen Corrigan, June 19, 2008.
Book Review of Say You're One of Them, Joseph Adero Ngala, Director of People for Peace in Africa (PPA) in Nairobi, Kenya. This review originally was published in Colleagues Home & Abroad Regional News (PPA) on 9 September 2008.

1971 births
University of Michigan alumni
Creighton University alumni
Nigerian writers
Nigerian male short story writers
Nigerian short story writers
Nigerian expatriates in the United States
Living people